Osgar was a 10th-century Abbot of Abingdon in the English county of Berkshire (now Oxfordshire).

Osgar was a cleric in minor orders who went with Saint Aethelwold from Glastonbury to Abingdon. He was eventually appointed Æthelwold's successor, probably in 964 and died in 984 (Kelly 2000).

References 
Kelly, S. E. 2000. Charters of Abingdon, part 1. Anglo-Saxon Charters 7.

External links
 

Abbots of Abingdon
984 deaths
Year of birth unknown